La gorilla ("The female bodyguard") is a 1982 Italian comedy film directed by Romolo Guerrieri.

Plot 
Misadventures of the bodyguard Ruby, a  muscular girl is in love with a shy designer in spite of her father, the owner of the security agency Securitas, who would want her married to more rich and important pretenders.

Cast 

 Lory Del Santo: Ruby
 Gianfranco D'Angelo: Ruby's Father 
 Tullio Solenghi: Adelmo Spallanzani 
 Giorgio Bracardi: Professor Marcellini/ Professor Aristide Pollastrini 
 Ugo Fangareggi: Macrò

See also        
 List of Italian films of 1982

References

External links

Italian comedy films
1982 comedy films
1982 films
Films directed by Romolo Guerrieri
Films scored by Fabio Frizzi
1980s Italian-language films
1980s Italian films